KK Strumica is a basketball club based in Strumica, North Macedonia. They currently compete in the Macedonian First League.

History
It was founded in 1991 under the name Makedonija '91, and was later also known as Polo Trejd. The club changed its name to ABA Strumica from 2005 to 2012.ABA Strumica merged with KK Millenium Strumica  in season 2011-2012.  After a change in leadership in 2005, a new president, Pajanotis Karapiperis, formed a strong culture by bringing in significant players to the team. 
Champions They become champions of the Macedonian First League in the 2006–07 season.They were  Macedonian Cup finalists in 2007 and 2008. However, following the 2007–08 season, the club canceled its participation in the First League and the newly formed Balkan League due to financial concerns. They continued to play in the Second League until 2012, where after winning the 2011–12 championship, they folded completely and merged with ABA Strumica.
 KK Strumica is back .From year 2014 financial problems were fixed and behind. The city of Strumica became owner and main sponsor of the team. The team is back in the top flight Macedonian Basketball Championship .

Home Ground
KK Strumica plays their basketball matches at Arena Park .Sports Hall with capacity of 5000.

Champions 
  (2) : 1982 ,2007

Current roster 2017/18

Depth chart

Strumica in FIBA competitions

1993 Radivoj Korać Cup
{| class="wikitable" style="text-align: left; font-size:95%"
|- bgcolor="#ccccff"
! Round
! Team
! Home
!   Away  
|-
|1.Round
| TIIT Kharkov
| style="text-align:center;"|97–75
| style="text-align:center;"|103–68
|-
|}1997 Eurocup2007 Eurocup'''

Notable past players

 Zlatko Gocevski
 Dime Tasovski
 Darko Sokolov
 Eftim Bogoev
 Viktor Krstevski
 Toni Grnčarov
 Tomčo Sokolov
 Dimče Gaštarski
 Slobodančo Hadživasilev
 Vassilis Kitsoulis
 Vasslis Tsimpliaridis
 Savvas Manousos
 Miljan Pupović
 Damir Latović
 Ivan Bošnjak
 Njegoš Abazović
 Nenad Delić
 Wesley Fluellen

References

External links
 Eurobasket.com KK Sturmica Page

2005 establishments in the Republic of Macedonia
Basketball teams established in 2005
Basketball teams in North Macedonia
Sport in Strumica